Simon Tunbridge (born 1 April 1993) is a former professional Australian rules footballer who played for the West Coast Eagles in the Australian Football League (AFL). He was recruited by the club in the 2012 rookie draft, with pick 51. Tunbridge made his debut in round 14, 2013, against  at Subiaco Oval. He was delisted in October 2015, however, he was re-drafted in the 2016 rookie draft. He was again delisted at the conclusion of the 2017 season.

Statistics
 Statistics are correct to the end of the 2017 season

|- style="background-color: #EAEAEA"
! scope="row" style="text-align:center" | 2013
|
| 46 || 2 || 2 || 1 || 11 || 0 || 11 || 2 || 3 || 1.0 || 0.5 || 5.5 || 0.0 || 5.5 || 1.0 || 1.5
|-
! scope="row" style="text-align:center" | 2014
|
| 32 || 4 || 2 || 4 || 16 || 2 || 18 || 8 || 7 || 0.5 || 1.0 || 4.0 || 0.5 || 4.5 || 2.0 || 1.8
|- style="background:#eaeaea;"
! scope="row" style="text-align:center" | 2015
|
| 32 || 1 || 0 || 0 || 6 || 4 || 10 || 1 || 1 || 0.0 || 0.0 || 6.0 || 4.0 || 10.0 || 1.0 || 1.0
|-
! scope="row" style="text-align:center" | 2016
|
| 32 || 3 || 1 || 0 || 19 || 10 || 29 || 7 || 13 || 0.3 || 0.0 || 6.3 || 3.3 || 9.7 || 2.3 || 4.3
|- class="sortbottom"
! colspan=3| Career
! 10
! 5
! 5
! 52
! 16
! 68
! 18
! 24
! 0.5
! 0.5
! 5.2
! 1.6
! 6.8
! 1.8
! 2.4
|}

References

External links

Tunbridge, Simon
Tunbridge, Simon
West Coast Eagles players
Tunbridge, Simon
Tunbridge, Simon
Tunbridge, Simon
East Perth Football Club players